William Anthony Patrick Smallbone (born 21 February 2000) is an Irish professional footballer who plays as a central midfielder for Championship club Stoke City on loan from Premier League club Southampton and the Republic of Ireland national team.

Club career

Southampton 
On 21 February 2017, Smallbone signed a professional contract with Southampton. Smallbone made his professional debut for Southampton in a 2–0 FA Cup victory over Huddersfield Town on 4 January 2020, scoring the opening goal.

On 22 February 2020, Smallbone went on to make his Premier League debut in a 2–0 victory over Aston Villa.

Having just started to appear regularly for the first team, on 16 January 2021, Smallbone suffered an anterior cruciate ligament injury in a 2–0 defeat at Leicester. As a result, he was expected to be out of action for up to six months.

On 26 October 2021, Smallbone made his first professional appearance since his injury, replacing Stuart Armstrong in Southampton’s defeat to Chelsea after a penalty shootout in the EFL Cup.

Stoke City (loan) 
On 23 July 2022, Smallbone joined Stoke City on a season-long loan. He scored his first goal for Stoke in a 2-0 win at Preston North End on 15 October 2022.

International career
Smallbone made his debut for Republic of Ireland U21s against Italy U21s in October 2020. On 3 June 2022, he scored his first goals for the Republic of Ireland U21 team, scoring a brace in a 3–0 win over Bosnia and Herzegovina U21 at Tallaght Stadium. He followed that up by scoring a volley from outside the box three days later, to open the scoring in an eventual 3–1 win over Montenegro U21. In November 2022, Smallbone was included in Stephen Kenny's senior squad for forthcoming friendlies.

Personal life
Smallbone was diagnosed with alopecia in 2021 whilst recovering from his ACL injury.

Career statistics

References

External links
 
 
 Southampton FC Profile

2000 births
Living people
Sportspeople from Basingstoke
Republic of Ireland association footballers
Republic of Ireland youth international footballers
English footballers
English people of Irish descent
Association football midfielders
Southampton F.C. players
Stoke City F.C. players
Premier League players
Footballers from Hampshire
English Football League players